The Schleswig Community School District is a public school district based in Schleswig, Iowa.  The district is mainly in Crawford County, with a small area in Ida County.  The district serves the towns of Schleswig and Ricketts, and the surrounding rural areas.

The district shares a superintendent with the Denison Community School District.
The school's mascot is the Hawks. Their colors are black and gold.

History
Since 1994, through a sharing agreement with Denison CSD, students from Schleswig attend high school in Denison, and compete as Denison-Schleswig.

Schools
The district operates two schools in a single building, located at 214 Date Street, Schleswig:
Schleswig Elementary School
Schleswig Middle School

References

External links
 Schleswig Community School District

Education in Crawford County, Iowa
Education in Ida County, Iowa
School districts in Iowa